Michelle A. Schultz is an American attorney and government official. A member of the Republican Party, she has served as a member of the Surface Transportation Board (STB) since January 11, 2021.

Education 
Schultz received her B.A. from Pennsylvania State University and her J.D. from the Widener University Delaware Law School. She also holds a Master of Government Administration degree from the University of Pennsylvania.

Career 
Prior to joining the STB, Schultz worked at SEPTA as the agency's director of legislative affairs and later as deputy general counsel. Earlier in her career, she was an associate at White and Williams LLP.

Surface Transportation Board 
In March 2018, Schultz was nominated by President Donald Trump for a newly-created position on the STB, which expanded from three to five members following the passage of the  STB Reauthorization Act of 2015.

Schultz was confirmed to the position on November 18, 2020 by the United States Senate. She was sworn into office on January 11, 2021.

Personal life 
Schultz is married to attorney Jim Schultz, who served as Associate White House Counsel in 2017.

References

Surface Transportation Board personnel
Trump administration personnel
Biden administration personnel
Pennsylvania State University alumni
Widener University School of Law alumni
University of Pennsylvania alumni
Date of birth missing (living people)
Year of birth missing (living people)
Living people